Clute may refer to:

People

Arts and entertainment
 Chester Clute (1891–1956), American bit-part film actor
 John Clute (born 1940), Canadian writer and critic
 Judith Clute (born 1942), Canadian painter, graphic designer, print-maker, and illustrator
 Sidney Clute (1916–1985), American film and TV actor (Cagney & Lacey, McCloud)

Other
 Dan Clute (born 1966), politician in Iowa, United States 
 George W. Clute (1842–1919), soldier in the American Civil War 
 Oscar Clute (1857–1935), president of the State Agricultural College, Michigan, United States 
 Willard Nelson Clute (1869–1950), U.S. botanist

Places
 Clute, Ontario, Canada, a "displaced rural community" 
 Clute station, a railway station 
 Clute, Texas, United States, a city

See also
 Klute, 1971 film with Jane Fonda